Raul Rodriguez or Raúl Rodríguez may refer to:

 Raul A. Rodriguez, real name of early electro artiste C.O.D. (musician)
 Raúl Rodríguez (boxer) (born 1915), Argentine boxer
 Raúl Rodríguez (footballer) (born 1987), Spanish footballer
 Raúl Rodríguez Navas (born 1988), Spanish footballer

See also
 Raoul Rodriguez (born 1963), American Olympic rower